Aglossa gigantalis is a species of snout moth in the genus Aglossa. It was described by William Barnes and Foster Hendrickson Benjamin in 1925 and is found in North America, including the type location of Arizona.

References

Moths described in 1925
Pyralini
Moths of North America